Mayke Rocha de Oliveira (born 10 November 1992), simply known as Mayke, is a Brazilian footballer who plays as a right back for Palmeiras.

Honours

Club
Cruzeiro
Campeonato Brasileiro Série A: 2013, 2014
Campeonato Mineiro: 2014

Palmeiras
Campeonato Brasileiro Série A: 2018, 2022
Campeonato Paulista: 2020, 2022
Copa Libertadores: 2020, 2021
Copa do Brasil: 2020
Recopa Sudamericana: 2022

Individual
Bola de Prata: 2013, 2018
Campeonato Brasileiro Série A Team of the Year: 2018

References

External links
Cruzeiro profile 
Mayke featured in Brazil: the talent factory 2013

1992 births
Living people
Sportspeople from Minas Gerais
Brazilian footballers
Association football defenders
Campeonato Brasileiro Série A players
Cruzeiro Esporte Clube players
Sociedade Esportiva Palmeiras players